Polatlı (formerly Ancient Greek: Γόρδιον, Górdion and Latin: Gordium) is a city and a district in Ankara Province in the Central Anatolia region of Turkey, 80 km west of the Turkish capital Ankara, on the road to Eskişehir. According to 2019 census, population of the district is 125,075 of which 98,605 live in the city of Polatlı. The district covers an area of 3,789 km2, and the average elevation is 850 m.

Geography
Polatlı is situated at the heart of the high Anatolian Plateau, a large steppe covered with grass. Far from the coast, it has a typical steppe climate. The winters are generally cold, the summers dry and dusty. The springs are the most humid times of the year. Polatlı is one of the most productive agricultural districts in Turkey and is best known for its cereal production, especially barley and wheat. Polatlı is one of Turkey's largest grain stores. Sugar beet, melon and onion are also grown.

History

Ancient settlement 
The ancient Phrygian capital Gordion is 10 km from the city of Polatlı.

On the outskirts of Polatli there is an archaeological mound of the same name, the remains of a multi-layered settlement of the Bronze Age (3rd-2nd millennium BC).  Since the mound was being used by local people as a quarry, rescue excavations of its southern and central parts were carried out in 1949 by the Anglo-Turkish expedition led by Seton Lloyd, and Nuri Gökçe, then the director of the ‘Hittite Museum in Ankara’.

Classical antiquity 
On his expedition to the east, Alexander the Great cut the famous Gordian Knot, an omen of his coming rule over the whole Asia.  Pessinus, an ancient city on the upper river Sangarios (modern day Sakarya River), is also within the borders of Polatlı.  The mythological Phrygian King Midas is said to have ruled from Pessinus and to be buried here.

Polatlı also occupied an important place in the Greco-Turkish War of 1919-1922 as the Battle of Sakarya (August 23-September 13, 1921) was fought here, the utmost eastern point reached by the advancing Greek Army in Anatolia. There are two memorial burial grounds of those lost in the battle.

Hacitugrul mound 
Since the 1970s, excavations by Turkish archaeologists have been carried out near the modern town and train station of Yenidoğan, Polatlı, 15 km northeast of Polatli and 20 km from Gordion. This site, near Hacıtuğrul, Polatlı, is now known as :tr:Hacıtuğrul Höyüğü. The remains of monumental fortifications and other buildings of the city of the Phrygian time, which exceeded Gordion in size, were found here. Five burial mounds were found in the vicinity.

Villages in the district

 Adatoprakpınar
 Avdanlı
 Avşar
 Babayakup
 Basri
 Beyceğiz
 Beylikköprü
 Beşköprü
 Çanakçı
 Çekirdeksiz
 Çimenceğiz
 Eskikarsak
 Eskiköseler
 Eskipolatlı
 Gedikli
 Gençali
 Gülpınar
 Gümüşyaka
 Gündoğan
 Güreş
 Hacımusa
 Hacımuslu
 Hacıosmanoğlu
 Hacıtuğrul
 Hıdırşeyh
 Ilıca
 İğciler
 Kabakköy
 Karaahmet
 Karabenli
 Karacaahmet
 Karahamzalı
 Karailyas
 Karakaya
 Karakuyu
 Karapınar
 Karayavşan
 Kargalı
 Kayabaşı
 Kocahacılı
 Kuşçu
 Kıranharmanı
 Kızılcakışla
 Macun
 Müslüm
 Olukpınar
 Oğuzlar
 Ömerler
 Ördekgölü
 Özyurt
 Poyraz
 Sabanca
 Sakarya
 Sarıhalil
 Sarıoba
 Sazlar
 Sinanlı
 Sincik
 Sivri
 Şabanözü
 Şeyhahmetli
 Şeyhali
 Tatlıkuyu
 Taşpınar
 Toydemir
 Tüfekçioğlu
 Türkkarsak
 Türktaciri
 Uzunbeyli
 Üçpınar
 Yaralı
 Yassıhüyük
 Yağcıoğlu
 Yağmurbaba
 Yenice
 Yenidoğan
 Yeniköseler
 Yenimehmetli
 Yeşilöz
 Yüzükbaşı
 Yıldızlı

Polatlı today

Today, Polatlı is an important district of Ankara on the main road which connects the capital to the west of Turkey. The city has a good range of restaurants, bars, schools and other important amenities but still a quiet rural feel to it, and little social life except cafes, patisseries and window shopping on a Sunday afternoon. There are car repair workshops but otherwise little industry. Polatlı is trying to become an independent province from Ankara and "we want to be a city" graffiti can be seen in the town.

There is a military base here and the Turkish Army Artillery School was established in Polatlı in the early 1940s and is still an important institution in the town.

Polatlıspor is a minor league football club that once climbed into the second league.

There is a large statue of a kangaroo on the main road into city.

Longwave transmitter 
Near Polatli, there is a longwave broadcasting transmitter, which works on 180 kHz with a transmitter output power of 1200 kW. It uses as antenna a single 250 metres tall mast situated at 39°45'22"N   32°25'5"E. The station is known as "Polatlı Vericisi."

Notes

References

External links
 District governor's official website 
 District municipality's official website 
 Everyday images of Polatlı 

 
Populated places in Ankara Province
Cities in Turkey
Districts of Ankara Province